A greatcoat (also watchcoat) is a large, woollen overcoat designed for warmth and protection against wind and weather, and features a collar that can be turned up and cuffs that can be turned down to protect the face and the hands, whilst the short rain-cape at the shoulders protects from the wind and repels rain. In the 19th century, the 'watchcoat' was part of a soldier's military uniform, to be worn whilst on watch (guard duty), hence the term watchcoat.

The drape of the greatcoat reached to below the knee of the wearer, the short cape drapes to the elbow, and the capacious external pockets allow the wearer to carry dry food and other items; an example is the Petersham coat, named after Viscount Petersham. In the fashion of the Regency era (1795–1837) a greatcoat might feature several short capes, usually designed, cut, and tailored to the specifications of fit and aesthetic taste of a dandy.

Gallery

See also
Trench coat
Livery

References

17th-century fashion
18th-century fashion
19th-century fashion
Coats (clothing)
Military uniforms